The Women's 500 metres competition at the 2017 World Single Distances Speed Skating Championships was held on 10 February 2017.

Results
The race was started at 17:30.

References

Women's 500 metres
World